This is a list of schools in Pahang, Malaysia. It is categorised according to the variants of schools in Malaysia, and is arranged alphabetically.

Secondary education: Sekolah Menengah Agama (SMA) 
 Sekolah Menengah Agama Al Attas (SMAA), Pekan
Sekolah Menengah Agama Al-Ihsan (SMAI), Kuantan
 Sekolah Menengah Agama Al-khairiah (SMAKT), Temerloh
 Sekolah Menengah Agama Bukit Ibam
 Sekolah Menengah Kebangsaan Agama Tengku Ampuan Hajjah Afzan Pahang Jerantut (TAHAP)
 Sekolah Menengah Kebangsaan Agama Pahang
 Sekolah Menengah Agama Tengku Ampuan Fatimah, Pekan, Pahang

SEKOLAH BERASRAMA PENUH (SBP)
 Sekolah Sains Sultan Haji Ahmad Shah Pekan (SHAH)
 Sekolah Berasrama Penuh Integrasi Kuantan (INTEK)
 Sekolah Berasrama Penuh Integrasi Tun Abdul Razak (InSTAR)
 Sekolah Berasrama Penuh Integrasi Temerloh
 Sekolah Menengah Sains Sultan Haji Ahmad Shah Kuantan (SEMSAS)
 Sekolah Menengah Sains Tengku Abdullah Raub (SEMESTA)

National schools

Primary education

Sekolah Kebangsaan (SK)
 Sekolah Kebangsaan (Felda) Lepar Hilir
 Sekolah Kebangsaan (Felda) Sungai Koyan, Raub (SKSK)
 Sekolah Kebangsaan (LKTP) Chini Timur 01 (SKCT 01)
 Sekolah Kebangsaan Abu Bakar Mentakab
 Sekolah Kebangsaan Assunta Convent (SKAC)
 Sekolah Kebangsaan Bandar Jerantut
 Sekolah Kebangsaan Bandar Temerloh
 Sekolah Kebangsaan Batu Kapor
 Sekolah Kebangsaan Bukit Bota
 Sekolah Kebangsaan Bukit Ibam, Muadzam Shah
 Sekolah Kebangsaan Bukit Ridan, Muadzam Shah
 Sekolah Kebangsaan Bukit Sekilau Kuantan (SKBS) CBA4076
 Sekolah Kebangsaan Bukit Setongkol CBA
 Sekolah Kebangsaan Buluh Nipis
 Sekolah Kebangsaan Cenderawasih
 Sekolah Kebangsaan Chenor
 Sekolah Kebangsaan Galing
 Sekolah Kebangsaan Indera Mahkota (SKIM)
 Sekolah Kebangsaan Indera Mahkota Utama (SKIMU)
 Sekolah Kebangsaan Jerantut
 Sekolah Kebangsaan Kampung Chat
 Sekolah Kebangsaan Keratong Lapan, Muadzam Shah
 Sekolah Kebangsaan Keratong Sepuluh, Muadzam Shah
 Sekolah Kebangsaan Kerayong, Bera
 Sekolah Kebangsaan Ladang Kota Bahagia, Muadzam Shah
 Sekolah Kebangsaan Mahmud, Raub
 Sekolah Kebangsaan Sungai Karang
 Sekolah Kebangsaan Padang Tengku, Kuala Lipis (SKPT)
 Sekolah Kebangsaan LKTP Jengka 12,Maran,Pahang
 Sekolah Kebangsaan Mentakab (Chatin)
 Sekolah Kebangsaan Muadzam Jaya, Muadzam Shah
 Sekolah Kebangsaan Muadzam Shah, Muadzam Shah
 Sekolah Kebangsaan Pengkalan Tentera
 Sekolah Kebangsaan Permatang Badak
 Sekolah Kebangsaan Pianggu
 Sekolah Kebangsaan Pulau Mansok
 Sekolah Kebangsaan Simpang Pelangai
 Sekolah Kebangsaan Sri Layang, Genting Highlands
 Sekolah Kebangsaan Sulaiman Bentong
 Sekolah Kebangsaan Sultan Abdullah, Kuantan
 Sekolah Kebangsaan Sungai Isap
 Sekolah Kebangsaan Sungai Soi
 Sekolah Kebangsaan Tanjong Gemok
 Sekolah Kebangsaan Tanjung Lumpur
 Sekolah Kebangsaan Teruntum
 Sekolah Kebangsaan Kota Perdana
 Sekolah Kebangsaan Sungai Baging
 Sekolah Kebangsaan Wira, Kuantan
 Sekolah Kebangsaan Perting, Bentong
 Sekolah Kebangsaan Peramu Jaya
 Sekolah Kebangsaan Pulau Serai
 Sekolah Kebangsaan Tanjong Agas, Pekan

Sekolah Jenis Kebangsaan Tamil (SJK [T])

♦ SJK (Tamil) Mentakab (Cluster School)

♦ SJK (Tamil) Bandar Indera Mahkota

♦ SJK (Tamil) Bukit Fraser

♦ SJK (Tamil) Ladang Mentakab

♦ SJK (Tamil) Sri Telemong

♦ SJK (Tamil) Lurah Bilut

♦ SJK (Tamil) Ladang Renjok

♦ SJK (Tamil) Karak

♦ SJK (Tamil) Bentong

♦ SJK (Tamil) Ladang Lanchang

♦ SJK (Tamil) Ladang Semantan

♦ SJK (Tamil) Ladang Yeow Cheng Luan

♦ SJK (Tamil) Ladang Jeram

♦ SJK (Tamil) Ladang Telemong

♦ SJK (Tamil) Ladang Kuala Reman

♦ SJK (Tamil) Ladang Karmen

♦ SJK (Tamil) Ladang Edensor

♦ SJK (Tamil) Ladang Sg. Palas

♦ SJK (Tamil) Ladang Gali

♦ SJK (Tamil) Ladang Bee Yong

♦ SJK (Tamil) Ladang Kawang

♦ SJK (Tamil) Ladang Tekal

♦ SJK (Tamil) Ladang Menteri

♦ SJK (Tamil) Ladang Kemayan

♦ SJK (Tamil) Ladang Boh 1

♦ SJK (Tamil) Ladang Boh 2

♦ SJK (Tamil) Shum Yip Leong

♦ SJK (Tamil) Ladang Cheroh

♦ SJK (Tamil) Ringlet

♦ SJK (Tamil) Ladang Selborne

♦ SJK (Tamil) Ladang Benta

♦ SJK (Tamil) Ladang Budu

♦ SJK (Tamil) Kuala Lipis

♦ SJK (Tamil) Tanah Rata

♦ SJK (Tamil) Ladang Blue Valley

♦ SJK (Tamil) Shum Yip Leong

♦ SJK (Tamil) Kuala Terla

♦ SJK (Tamil) Jerantut

♦ SJK (Tamil) Raub

♦ SJK (Tamil) Ladang Cheroh

♦ SJK (Tamil) Sungai Penjuring

♦ SJK (Tamil) Jerik

Secondary education: Sekolah Menengah Kebangsaan (SMK)

Chinese Type Primary and Secondary School

SMJK School
 Sekolah Menengah Jenis Kebangsaan Chung Ching 
 Sekolah Menengah Jenis Kebangsaan Chung Hwa 
 Sekolah Menengah Jenis Kebangsaan Hwa Lian 
 Sekolah Menengah Jenis Kebangsaan Katholik  
 Sekolah Menengah Jenis Kebangsaan Khai Mun  
 Sekolah Menengah Jenis Kebangsaan Tanah Puteh 
 Sekolah Menengah Jenis Kebangsaan Triang

Chinese Independent School
Sekolah Menengah Chong Hwa Kuantan

Chinese Primary School

BENTONG
SJK(C) KHAI MUN PAGI,
SJK(C) KHAI MUN REPAS,
SJK(C) KHAI MUN CHAMANG,
SJK(C) KETARI
SJK(C) PERTING
SJK(C) SUNGAI DUA
SJK(C) KARAK
SJK(C) TELEMONG
SJK(C) MANCHIS
SJK(C) BUKIT TINGGI
SJK(C) LURAH BILUT
SJK(C) SUNGAI PENJURING

CAMERON HIGHLANDS
SJK(C) CAMERON
SJK(C) TANAH RATA
SJK(C) BRINCHANG
SJK(C) KAMPUNG RAJA
SJK(C) BERTAM VALLEY
SJK(C) TRINGKAP
SJK(C) KEA FARM
SJK(C) KUALA TERLA

JERANTUT
SJK(C) SUNGAI JAN
SJK(C) BATU BALAI
SJK(C) JERANSONG
SJK(C) DAMAK

LIPIS
SJK(C) MELA
SJK(C) CHUNG HWA
SJK(C) PADANG TENGKU
SJK(C) JERKOH
SJK(C) PENJOM
SJK(C) BENTA

KUANTAN
SJK(C) SEMAMBU
SJK(C) CHUNG CHING
SJK(C) KUANG HWA
SJK(C) PEI CHAI
SJK(C) GAMBANG
SJK(C) YOKE SHIAN
SJK(C) KONG MIN
SJK(C) LEMBING
SJK(C) PANCHING
SJK(C) POOI MING
SJK(C) TAMAN TAS

PEKAN
SJK(C) PEKAN
SJK(C) KEE WHA
SJK(C) YOKE HWA

ROMPIN
SJK(C) ROMPIN

RAUB
SJK(C) CHUNG CHING
SJK(C) SEMPALIT
SJK(C) SUNGAI RUAN
SJK(C) YUH HWA
SJK(C) SG LUI
SJK(C) CHEROH
SJK(C) TRAS
SJK(C) SUNGAI CHETANG
SJK(C) SANG LEE
SJK(C) SG KLAU

TEMERLOH
SJK(C) SUNGAI KAWANG
SJK(C) KHEE CHEE
SJK(C) MENTAKAB (1)
SJK(C) MENTAKAB (2)
SJK(C) LANCHANG
SJK(C) YEOW CHENG LUAN
SJK(C) KERDAU
SJK(C) KUALA KRAU

BERA
SJK(C) TRIANG (1)
SJK(C) TRIANG (2)
SJK(C) KERAYONG
SJK(C) MENGKUANG
SJK (C) MENGKARAK
SJK(C) KEMASUL
SJK(C) MENTERI
SJK(C) KEMAYAN

MARAN
SJK(C) PEI MIN
SJK(C) MARAN
SJK(C) JERIK

Technical secondary schools: Sekolah Menengah Teknik (SMT)
 Sekolah Menengah Teknik Jengka
 Sekolah Menengah Teknik Kuala Lipis
 Sekolah Menengah Teknik Kuala Rompin
 Sekolah Menengah Teknik Kuantan
 Sekolah Menengah Teknik Muadzam Shah
 Sekolah Menengah Teknik Pertanian Chenor
 Sekolah Menengah Teknik Seri Pelindong
 Sekolah Menengah Teknik Temerloh
 Sekolah Menengah Teknik Tengku Ampuan Afzan (SMTTAA), Bentong

Others 
 Highlands International Boarding School
 International School of Kuantan
 Maktab Rendah Sains MARA Kuala Lipis
 Maktab Rendah Sains MARA Kuantan
 Maktab Rendah Sains MARA Muadzam Shah
 Maktab Rendah Sains MARA Pekan
 Maktab Rendah Sains MARA Bentong

Sekolah Indera Shahbandar Pahang (SISP) is for primary school starting from standard 4 to standard 6.
 SISP Seri Pekan
 SISP Seri Tualang
 SISP Seri Bentong
 SISP Clifford

Pahang